Evgeni Ivanov (born 3 June 1974 in Sofia, Bulgaria) is a former Bulgarian volleyball player, a former member of Bulgaria men's national volleyball team, a participant of the Olympic Games (Atlanta 1996, Beijing 2008), a bronze medalist of the World Cup 2007.

Personal life
Ivanov was born in Sofia, Bulgaria. He has wife and two children - Sarah and Simona. Creator and owner of the first private organization dealing with sports management, marketing and public health in Bulgaria - ASEM GROUP Ltd.  ("ASEM Group" Ltd.). Ivanov develop original projects related to the prevention and care of children's health, supports national campaigns promoting junior sport and promotes physical activity for the whole family as a healthy lifestyle.

Career

Clubs
He is alumnus of the Bulgarian club VC CSKA Sofia. His first coach was Nikolai Adamov, who worked with this team. In season 2006/2007 was a player of the BOT Skra Bełchatów. He won with club from Bełchatów title of Polish Champion and Polish Cup 2007. In 2007/2008 played for another Polish club - Jastrzębski Węgiel, but the team lost their 3rd place match with AZS Olsztyn. Club didn't renew the contract. Then he played in Iran to 2010. In 2010, he returned to VC CSKA Sofia, where in 2012 ended his career as an active competitor.

Sporting achievements

Clubs

National championships
 2006/2007  Polish Cup, with BOT Skra Bełchatów
 2006/2007  Polish Championship, with BOT Skra Bełchatów
 2009/2010  Bulgarian Championship, with CSKA Sofia
 2010/2011  Bulgarian Championship, with CSKA Sofia

References

1974 births
Living people
Bulgarian men's volleyball players
Volleyball players at the 1996 Summer Olympics
Volleyball players at the 2008 Summer Olympics
Olympic volleyball players of Bulgaria
Expatriate volleyball players in Poland
Polish Champions of men's volleyball
Skra Bełchatów players